The Gap FC is an Australian football (soccer) club from The Gap, a suburb of Brisbane. The club was formed in 1955, and currently competes in the Brisbane Premier League. The club's distinctive gold and purple colours have been with the club since its earliest days and derive from the name of the suburb (GAP – Gold and Purple).

History
The Gap Pastime Club was formed on 17 February 1955 as a multi-sports club with the main focus in its early years on cricket, soccer and softball. The club initially played its soccer at Jubilee Park, Bardon before moving to its current home, the Walton Bridge Reserve in 1959.

The Gap FC rose through the lower divisions in its early years, then spent a decade in Division 2 after winning promotion from the Third Division in 1966. During this period, The Gap reached the quarter-finals of the 1974 Ampol Cup, the only time to date it has advanced this far in a Brisbane senior cup competition. Following relegation in 1976, The Gap has mostly competed at the second and third level of the Brisbane football system. The Gap FC spent two seasons in the Brisbane Premier League in 2002 and 2003 after winning a promotion play-off against Pine Rivers United in 2001.

In 2016 The Gap FC were premiers of Capital League 2 resulting in promotion to Capital League 1, in the process achieving a first team club record of 92 goals in the regular season. After the creation of the Football Queensland Premier League, The Gap was moved up to the Brisbane Premier League for the 2018 season and made the final series after finishing in fourth place.

Recent Seasons

Source:

The tier is the level in the Australian soccer league system

Honours

Brisbane Division 3 – Premiers 1966
Brisbane Division 2 – Premiers and Champions 1986
Brisbane Division 3 – Premiers and Champions 1987
Capital League 2 – Champions 2013
Capital League 2 – Premiers 2016

References

External links
 

Soccer clubs in Brisbane
Brisbane Premier League teams
Association football clubs established in 1955
1955 establishments in Australia
The Gap, Queensland